Keith Monroe (22 August 1915 – 30 August 2003) was an American author of children's science fiction and of books and magazine articles about Boy Scouting.

Monroe attended Stanford University and UCLA. He worked as a reporter for the New York Herald Tribune, for advertising and public relations firms, and for North American Rockwell. At times, he was a full-time freelance writer.

His work appeared in such magazines as Saturday Evening Post, New Yorker, |Harper's, Blue Book, Galaxy, Argosy, Boys' Life, and Scouting.  His pseudonyms included Donald Keith, Rice E. Cochran, and Dale Colombo.

Scouting 
Monroe was deeply involved with Scouting. He served as Scoutmaster for Troop 2 in Santa Monica, California from its founding in December 1945 until 1987.

He wrote articles for Scouting, the magazine for adult Scout leaders; merit badge instruction pamphlets; and fiction for Boys' Life. Under the name Rice E. Cochran, he published Be Prepared!, a humorous memoir of his experiences as a Scoutmaster.It was the basis for the 1953 movie Mister Scoutmaster.

Monroe was a recipient of the Silver Beaver Award.

Science fiction 
Collaborating under the pseudonym Donald Keith with his father, Donald Monroe, Keith Monroe wrote the Time Machine series, originally published in Boys' Life between 1959 and 1989.

Donald Keith also contributed stories to Galaxy Science Fiction and Blue Book.

Using the pseudonym Dale Colombo, Keith Monroe published in Boys' Lifea series about Scouts in space, featuring a protagonist named Ed Linden, set aboard the spaceship Magellan.  These Scouts had been born in interstellar space during the decades-long journey from Earth to planets orbiting a distant star.

Bibliography

Further reading

References

External links

 
 
 
 
 
 Rice E. Cochran at WorldCat with 1 catalog record

20th-century American novelists
American male novelists
American science fiction writers
1915 births
2003 deaths
American male short story writers
20th-century American short story writers
20th-century American male writers
Stanford University alumni
University of California, Los Angeles alumni